Marutha is a 2022 Indian Tamil-language drama film written and directed by GRS, who also stars in the lead role. Radhika Sarathkumar, Viji Chandrasekhar and Saravanan appear in the lead roles. Produced by GRS, it was released on 21 January 2022.

Cast 
GRS
Lovelyn Chandrasekhar as Amuthavalli
Viji Chandrasekhar as Kaali
Radhika Sarathkumar as Meenakshi
Saravanan as Maruthupandi
Vela Ramamoorthy as Maayan
G. Marimuthu (Cameo Appearance) 
Ganja Karuppu

Production 
The film marked the directorial and acting debut of GRS, an erstwhile assistant to Bharathiraja. He revealed that the film was based on practices that he had encountered in South Tamil Nadu such as 'Seimurai' – the act of gifting money during an occasion in advance so that the event is organised in a big scale.

GRS had shown the script to Bharathiraja, who helped him convince Radhika Sarathkumar to join the project. Once she accepted to do the film, other known actor such as Viji Chandrasekhar and Saravanan followed. The film began its shoot in late 2019 in Theni.

Soundtrack
Soundtrack was composed by Ilaiyaraaja.

Release 
The film was released on 21 January 2022 across theatres in Tamil Nadu. A critic from the Times of India wrote it is "an outdated film with few grace notes". Reviewers from Tamil newspapers, Maalai Malar and Dina Malar also gave the film negative reviews.

Home media
The film is available for streaming in Sun NXT.

References

External links 
 

2022 drama films
2020s Tamil-language films
2022 films
Indian drama films
2022 directorial debut films
Films scored by Ilaiyaraaja